Adrien Duvillard (born 8 February 1969 in Megève) is a French former alpine skier who competed in the 1992 Winter Olympics and 1998 Winter Olympics.

External links
 sports-reference.com
 

1969 births
Living people
French male alpine skiers
Olympic alpine skiers of France
Alpine skiers at the 1992 Winter Olympics
Alpine skiers at the 1998 Winter Olympics
Sportspeople from Haute-Savoie